Un pobre hombre is a Mexican telenovela produced by Teleprogramas Acapulco, SA in 1967.

Cast 
Lucha Altamirano
Héctor Andremar
Emily Cranz
Juan Antonio Edwards

References

External links 

Mexican telenovelas
1967 telenovelas
Televisa telenovelas
Spanish-language telenovelas
1967 Mexican television series debuts
1967 Mexican television series endings